G. Sankara Kurup, (3 June 1901  – 2 February 1978) also referred to as Mahakavi G (The Great Poet G), was an Indian poet, essayist and literary critic  of Malayalam literature. Known as one of the greats of Malayalam poetry, he was the first recipient of the Jnanpith Award―the highest Indian literary honor.  He served as a nominated member of the Rajya Sabha from 1968 to 1972 and received the Padma Bhushan, the third highest Indian civilian award, in 1967. He was also a recipient of Sahitya Akademi Award, Kerala Sahitya Akademi Award and Soviet Land Nehru Award.

Life and career 
Sankara Kurup was born on June 3, 1901 at Nayathode, a hamlet in the erstwhile Kingdom of Cochin (now in Ernakulam district of the south Indian state of Kerala) to Nellikkappilli Variyath Sankara Warrier and Vadakkani Marath Lakshmikutty Marasyar His early education was at the local schools in Nayathode and Perumbavoor after passing his 7th standard examination, he passed the Vernacular Higher Examination from a school in Muvattupuzha. Subsequently, he started his career as the headmaster of Kottamam Convent School when he was only 16 and during his tenure there, continued his studies to pass the Malayalam Pandit and Vidwan examinations. In 1927, he moved to Thiruvilluamala High School as the Malayalam Pandit and to Thrissur training school in 1927 as a teacher. In 1931, he joined Maharaja's College, Ernakulam as a lecturer where he stayed until his retirement from service as a professor in 1956. He also served as a producer at the Thiruvananthapuram station of the All India Radio.

Sankara Kurup served Kerala Sahitya Akademi as its fourth president. n He was also the president of the Kerala Sasthra Sahithya Parishad and served as the chief editor of its official magazine; it was during his tenure that the magazine became a tri-monthly. He edited another magazine, too, titled Thilakam. In 1968, he was nominated as a member of the Rajya Sabha, the upper house of the Parliament of India.

Sankara Kurup married Subhadra Amma in 1931 and the couple had two children, a son, Ravindranath and a daughter, Radha. Radha was married to M. Achuthan, an academic and a prominent literary critic. He died on February 2, 1979, aged 76, at Vappalassery, near Angamaly in Ernakulam district, Kerala, succumbing to the trauma following a surgery.

Legacy 

Kurup published his first poem, called Salutation to Nature in 1918, while still a student and his first poetry anthology, Sahitya Kouthukam, was published in 1923. By the time he published Sooryakanthi in 1935, he had already established his place among Malayalam poets. Overall, he published over 40 books which included 25 poetry anthologies, short stories, memoirs, play and prose. He translated the Rubáiyát (1932) of Omar Khayyám, the Sanskrit Meghadūta (1944) of Kalidas, and the collection of poems Gitanjali (1959) of Rabindranath Tagore into Malayalam. He also wrote the lyrics for P. J. Cherian's Nirmala, (1948), the first Malayalam film to incorporate music and songs. Besides Nirmala, he wrote the lyrics for such movies as Oral Koodi Kallanayi, Abhayam, Aduthaduthu and Olipporu. His poems have been translated into English by A. K. Ramanujan under the title, Selected poems of G. Sankara Kurup. Along with his masterpiece, Odakuzhal, Poojapushpam, Nimisham, Navathidhi, Ithalukal, Pathikante Paattu, Muthukal, Anthardaham, Chenkathirukal, Vishwadarshanam, Madhuram Soumyam Deeptham, and Sandhya Ragam are considered as his major works. His autobiography was titled Ormmayude Olangalil, and was published by National Book Stall.

Awards and honors 
Sankara Kurup received the Kerala Sahitya Akademi Award for Poetry in 1961 for his anthology, Viswadarshanam. The Central Sahitya Akademi honored him with their annual award for poetry in 1963. He was the first winner of the Jnanpith Award, India's highest literary award, when the award was instituted in 1965. He received the prize for his anthology, Odakkuzhal (The Bamboo Flute) which was published in 1950; He set apart a part of the prize money to establish Odakkuzhal Award in 1968 and the work was later translated into Hindi, titled, Bansuri. In 1967, he received the Soviet Land Nehru Award and a year later, the Government of India awarded him he third highest civilian honor of the Padma Bhushan. The India Post issued a commemorative postal stamp on Kurup in 2003, under the series, Jnanpith Award Winners.

Work

Poetry 

 
 
 
 
 
 
 
 
 
 
 
 
 
 
 
 
 
 
 
 
 
 
 
 
 
 
 
 
 
 
 Kavanakalika (Poetic Buds)
 Dharmarashmi (The Rays of Justice)
 Muthukal (Pearls)
 Swathanthryodhayam (Sunrise of Freedom)
 Poojapushpam (Flowers for Offering)
 Ente Veyil (My Sunlight)

Short Story anthologies 
 
 
 
 Kathakauthukam

Essays 

 
 
 
 
 
 
 
 
 
 Mutthum Chippiyum (Pearl and Oyster) (1958)
 * 
 
 Bhashadeepika
 Bhasha Praveshika (2 volumes)

Plays

Translations 
 
 Meghadūta of Kalidasa
 Rubaiyat of Omar Khayam

Biography, autobiography

Letters

Translations into other languages

Books and articles on G. Sankara Kurup

Filmography 

 Nirmala
 Oral Koodi Kallanayi
 Abhayam
 Aduthaduthu
 Olipporu

References

Further reading

External links

 
 An overview of the major genres of modern Malayalam literature
 Bibliography of Malayalam Literature
 Another Bibliography of Malayalam literature
 G. Sankara Kurup's Jnanpith Award Acceptance Speech
 The Poet's commentary on his work
 Commemorative Stamp released by India Post on 9 October 2003 (image) 

1901 births
1978 deaths
Malayalam-language writers
Recipients of the Jnanpith Award
Writers from Kochi
Malayalam poets
Recipients of the Sahitya Akademi Award in Malayalam
Translators of Omar Khayyám
Recipients of the Padma Bhushan in literature & education
Recipients of the Kerala Sahitya Akademi Award
Nominated members of the Rajya Sabha
People from Ernakulam district
20th-century Indian translators
20th-century Indian poets
Poets from Kerala
Indian male poets
All India Radio people